Zakzouk     is a Maronite village in Koura District of Lebanon.

References

External links
 Majdel - Zakzouk - Ouata Fares,  Localiban

Maronite Christian communities in Lebanon
Populated places in the North Governorate
Koura District